William Alexander Kininmonth Murray (17 April 1894 – ?) was a Scottish international rugby union player, who played for . He was capped three times between 1920 and 1921 at flanker.

References

 player profile on Scrum.com

Scottish rugby union players
Scotland international rugby union players
1894 births
Year of death missing